Rożnowo  is a village in the administrative district of Gmina Oborniki, within Oborniki County, Greater Poland Voivodeship, in west-central Poland.

Rożnowo is best known as the birthplace of Włodzimierz Krzyżanowski, a military leader and brigade commander in the Union Army during the American Civil War. He was a first cousin to composer Frédéric Chopin.

The village has a population of 1,500.

References

Villages in Oborniki County